Caviar was an alternative rock band from Chicago, Illinois. The band was created around 1999 by vocalist/guitarist Blake Smith and bassist Mike Willison after the breakup of their previous band Fig Dish, due to disputes with their label. After visiting London, England, Smith and Willison learned of electronica's rise in popularity, and decided to implement this to their more guitar-driven sound, and both borrowed $10,000 from their fathers to begin their new project. Lead guitarist Dave Suh and drummer Jason Batchko were added to complete the lineup. The band released their debut self titled album in 2000, under major label Island Records, but only received modest success. They would release their second album, The Thin Mercury Sound in 2004, under smaller label Aezra. Smith and Willison later performed with Scott Lucas of Local H in the electronica project The Prairie Cartel. Smith later performed with Chicago noise pop band Forgotten Species, and has now gone into hotel management at Virgin Hotels in Chicago, as vice president of Entertainment and Brand Partnerships. Willison was in the Portland pop solo project Merit Badge, and has also been in the wine industry. Guitarist Suh has remained active and is currently the lead vocalist and guitarist of Chicago band The Assembly, along with his multi-instrumentalist brother, Nathan.

Caviar has had several songs played on the radio. The songs "Tangerine Speedo" and "On the DL" were their biggest hits. "Tangerine Speedo" was featured in the first Charlie's Angels movie and "Sugarless" was featured on the soundtrack of Gone in 60 Seconds. Safeway has featured in its TV commercials two songs from Thin Mercury Sound, including "Clean Getaway" in the summer of 2005 and "Lioness" in 2004. "Tangerine Speedo" was also featured in the ending of the 2003 film The Cat in the Hat, a movie adaptation of the Dr. Seuss book of the same name, as an instrumental. The track samples "El Bossa Nova" by Los Bucaneros.

A snippet of their song "The Good Times Are Over" was used in one of the final scenes in the DragonBall Z television special, "Bardock: The Father of Goku".

Discography

Albums
Caviar (2000)
Thin Mercury Sound (2004)

Singles
 "Tangerine Speedo" (2000 #28 Billboard Hot Modern Rock Tracks)

References

Alternative rock groups from Chicago
Indie rock musical groups from Illinois